for the 1630s pioneer of the printing press in the New World see Jose Glover.

Joseph Glover is an American professor and currently serves as the Provost for the University of Florida.

Glover attended Cornell University for his bachelor's degree, and he received his Master's and Doctorate in Mathematics from the University of California, San Diego.  Glover began his academic career at University of California, Berkeley, and he would go on to serve as an assistant professor at the University of Rochester from 1979-1982.

Career

University of Florida
In 1982, Glover joined the faculty at the University of Florida. In 1987 he was promoted to full Professor, and served as Chairman of the Department of Mathematics from 1993-1998.  Glover then served as the Associate Dean for Faculty Affairs for the College of Liberal Arts and Sciences. In 2001, he was named Associate Provost for Academic Affairs, and then was promoted in interim dean of College of Liberal Arts and Science in 2006, and he served in this capacity for the 2007-2008 academic year. Then in July 2008, Dr. Joseph Glover was appointed Provost of the University of Florida.

In September 2010, Glover pitched an idea to the Florida Board of Governors to give incoming UF students the option of taking classes during the spring and summer terms only, bypassing the fall semester, to ease the strain on its crowded facilities. He described it as a "productive, efficient way to admit more students to a university for which there is high-demand".

Block Tuition
Glover is the leading proponent of an effort by the University of Florida to institute block tuition, in replacement of having students pay by credit hour. Under one proposal, students would be charged a flat-rate fee analogous to 15 credits for full-time undergraduate students regardless if they take 12, 15 or 18 credits. Charging market-rate tuition for distance-education graduate students is also a part of the plan. Glover believes block tuition is the "way it should be," believing it would financially benefit students taking a heavy load of classes, cost slightly more for those taking fewer classes, could help increase UF’s graduation rate, and open up spots for students who might otherwise be turned away under enrollment limits. Glover made a statement saying "a student who spends more time here is taking up a spot that a student waiting in the wings is waiting to have." Glover estimates that the switch will generate a “small” revenue boost of about $4 million of extra recurring revenue, which would be reinvested in the form of adding sections to classes and hiring faculty to accommodate more students.

Education
Bachelor's degree in Mathematics from Cornell University in 1974.
Master's degree in Mathematics from the University of California, San Diego in 1977.
Doctorate in Mathematics from the University of California, San Diego in 1978.

References

External links
 
Alligator story discussing Dr. Glover's appointment
Dr. Glover's CV
Additional info about Glover - University of Florida Office of the Provost
Dr. Glover named interim dean of CLAS

|-

Cornell University alumni
Living people
University of California, San Diego alumni
University of Florida faculty
Year of birth missing (living people)